"Like You Love Me" is a song by American Christian pop artist Tauren Wells. It was released on December 13, 2019, as the lead single from his sophomore studio album, Citizen of Heaven (2020). Wells co-wrote the song with Chuck Butler, and Jordan Sapp. Chuck Butler collaborated with Jordan Sapp on producing the single. The song peaked at No. 17 on the US Hot Christian Songs chart.

Background
"Like You Love Me" was initially released by Tauren Wells as the fourth promotional single to the album, Citizen of Heaven(2020), on November 29, 2019. The song impacted Christian radio in the United States on December 13, 2019, as the first official single from the album.

Composition
"Like You Love Me" is composed in the key of B-flat major with a tempo of 111 beats per minute.

Commercial performance
In the United States, the song debuted at No. 42 on Billboard's Hot Christian Songs chart, and at No. 30 on the Christian Airplay chart, all dated January 6, 2020. Following the release of Citizen of Heaven, the song surged to No. 19 and No. 15 on Hot Christian Songs and Christian Airplay charts respectively, owing to significant gains in streaming and radio play. The song went on to peak at No. 17 on Hot Christian Songs, and No. 14 on Christian Airplay.

Music videos
On November 29, 2019, Tauren Wells published the official lyric video of "Like You Love Me" on YouTube. On December 13, 2019, Wells released the official music video of the song.

Charts

Weekly charts

Year-end charts

Release history

References

2019 songs
2019 singles
Tauren Wells songs
Songs written by Tauren Wells
Songs written by Chuck Butler